Agustín Rocha Cano (born 10 May 1971) is an Argentine rower. He competed in the men's lightweight double sculls event at the 1996 Summer Olympics.

Notes

References

External links
 
 
 

1971 births
Living people
Argentine male rowers
Olympic rowers of Argentina
Rowers at the 1996 Summer Olympics
Place of birth missing (living people)